The California League of Minor League Baseball is a Single-A baseball league in the United States. The league was founded in 1941, but ceased operations from 1942 to 1945 during World War II. The circuit reorganized in 1946 and was in continual operation through 2020. The 2020 season was cancelled due to the COVID-19 pandemic, and the league ceased operations before the 2021 season in conjunction with Major League Baseball's (MLB) reorganization of Minor League Baseball. In place of the California League, MLB created the Low-A West, an 8-team circuit divided into two divisions. Prior to the 2022 season, MLB renamed the Low-A West as the California League, and it carried on the history of the league prior to reorganization. In 2021, the Low-A West held a best-of-five series between the top two teams in the league, regardless of division standings, to determine a league champion.

A league champion has been determined at the end of each season by either postseason playoffs or being declared champion by the league office. In 2019, the first-half winner in each division (North and South) received a bye into the second round, or division series. Each division's second-half winner and wild card team, the team with the best winning percentage over the entire season to have not won either half of the season, faced each other in a best-of-three series. The winner of this mini-series met the division's first-half winner in a best-of-five series to determine division champions. Then, the North and South division winners played a best-of-five series to determine a league champion. As of 2022, the winners of each division from both the first and second halves of the season meet in a best-of-three division series, with the winners of the two division series meeting in a best-of-three championship series.

League champions
Score and finalist information is only presented when postseason play occurred. The lack of this information indicates a declared league champion.

Championship wins by team

Active California League teams appear in bold.

Notes
 San Jose and Lake Elsinore were declared co-champions after playoffs were cancelled in the wake the September 11, 2001 terrorist attacks.

References
General

Specific

California League champions
California League
C
California League